Kathleen Island is a steeply cliffed island that lies within Port Davey, an oceanic inlet, located in the south west region of Tasmania, Australia.

Features and location
The island is almost split by a deep gulch.

Kathleen island is part of the Port Davey Islands Important Bird Area, so identified by BirdLife International because of its importance for breeding seabirds. Most of the island is covered by thick scrub and rainforest.  Recorded breeding seabird species are the little penguin (1-200 pairs) and short-tailed shearwater (67,000 pairs).  Burrowing seabirds have caused erosion in places.  The metallic skink is present.

See also

 List of islands of Tasmania

References

Islands of South West Tasmania
Protected areas of Tasmania
Important Bird Areas of Tasmania